Geʽez is a script used as an abugida (alphasyllabary) for several Afro-Asiatic and Nilo-Saharan languages of Ethiopia and Eritrea. It originated as an abjad (consonant-only alphabet) and was first used to write the Geʽez language, now the liturgical language of the Ethiopian Orthodox Tewahedo Church, the Eritrean Orthodox Tewahedo Church, the Eritrean Catholic Church, the Ethiopian Catholic Church, and Haymanot Judaism of the Beta Israel Jewish community in Ethiopia. In the languages Amharic and Tigrinya, the script is often called , meaning “script” or “letter”. Under the Unicode Standard and ISO 15924, it is defined as Ethiopic text.

The Geʽez script has been adapted to write other languages, mostly Ethiosemitic, particularly Amharic in Ethiopia, and Tigrinya in both Eritrea and Ethiopia. It has also been used to write Sebat Bet and other Gurage languages and at least 20 other languages of Ethiopia. In Eritrea it has traditionally been used for Tigre and just recently for Bilen. The Ge'ez script has also recently been used to write Anuak, and used in limited extent to write some other Nilo-Saharan Nilotic languages, including Majang languages.  It was also used in the past to write some Omotic languages, including Wolaytta, Bench, Hamer, Kafa. 
For the representation of sounds, this article uses a system that is common (though not universal) among linguists who work on Ethiopian Semitic languages. This differs somewhat from the conventions of the International Phonetic Alphabet. See the articles on the individual languages for information on the pronunciation.

History and origins 

Ge'ez script is derived from the Ancient South Arabian script which originated in the region centred around what is now Yemen. The earliest inscriptions of Semitic languages in Eritrea and Ethiopia date to the 9th century BCE, which is known as Epigraphic South Arabian (ESA), an abjad shared with contemporary kingdoms in South Arabian peninsula.

After the 7th and 6th centuries BCE, variants of the South Arabian script arose, evolving in the direction of the later Geʻez abugida or alphasyllabary.
This evolution can be seen most clearly in evidence from inscriptions (mainly graffiti on rocks and caves) in the Tigray Region in northern Ethiopia and in many parts of Eritrea mainly in the former province of Akele Guzay. and the oldest example of Ge'ez script is the Hawulti obelisk in Matara, Eritrea.

By the first centuries CE, what is called "Old Ethiopic" or the "Old Geʻez writing system" arose, an abjad written right-to-left (as opposed to boustrophedon like ESA) with letters basically identical to the first-order forms of the modern vocalized writing system (e.g. "k" in the form of "kä"). There were also minor differences, such as the letter "g" facing to the right instead of to the left as in vocalized Geʻez, and a shorter left leg of "l", as in ESA, instead of equally-long legs in vocalized Geʻez (somewhat resembling the Greek letter lambda).
Vocalization of Geʻez occurred in the 4th century, and though the first completely vocalized texts known are inscriptions by Ezana, vocalized letters predate him by some years, as an individual vocalized letter exists in a coin of his predecessor, Wazeba of Axum. Linguist Roger Schneider has also pointed out in an unpublished early 1990s paper anomalies in the known inscriptions of Ezana of Axum that imply that he was consciously employing an archaic style during his reign, indicating that vocalization could have occurred much earlier.

As a result, some  believe that the vocalization may have been adopted to preserve the pronunciation of Geʻez texts due to the already moribund or extinct status of Geʻez, and that, by that time, the common language of the people were already later the Eritrean and Ethiopian Afro-Asiatic languages. At least one of Wazeba's coins from the late 3rd or early 4th century contains a vocalized letter, some 30 or so years before Ezana. Kobishchanov, Peter T. Daniels, and others have suggested possible influence from the Brahmic scripts in vocalization, as they are also abugidas, and the Kingdom of Aksum was an important part of major trade routes involving India and the Greco-Roman world throughout classical antiquity.

According to the beliefs of the Eritrean Orthodox Tewahedo Church and Ethiopian Orthodox Tewahedo Church, the original consonantal form of the Geʻez fidäl was divinely revealed to Enos "as an instrument for codifying the laws", and the present system of vocalisation is attributed to a team of Aksumite scholars led by Frumentius (Abba Selama), the same missionary said to have converted King Ezana to Christianity in the 4th century. It has been argued that the vowel marking pattern of the script reflects a South Asian system such as would have been known by Frumentius. A separate tradition, recorded by Aleqa Taye, holds that the Geʻez consonantal writing system was first adapted by Zegdur, a legendary king of the Agʻazyan Sabaean dynasty held to have ruled in Abyssinia (Eritrea and Ethiopia) c. 1300 BCE.

Geʻez has 26 consonantal letters. Compared to the inventory of 29 consonants in the South Arabian writing system, continuants are missing of ġ, ẓ, and South Arabian s3  (Geʻez Sawt ሠ being derived from South Arabian s2 ), as well as z and ṯ, these last two absences reflecting the collapse of the interdental with the alveolar fricatives. On the other hand, emphatic  ጰ, a Geʻez innovation, is a modification of  ጸ, while Pesa ፐ is based on Tawe ተ.

Thus, there are 24 correspondences of Geʻez and the South Arabian writing system:

Many of the letter names are cognate with those of Phoenician, and may thus be assumed for the Proto-Sinaitic script.

Geʽez writing system 
Two writing systems were used to write the Geʽez language, an abjad and later an abugida.

Geʽez abjad 
The abjad, used until the advent of Christianity (ca. AD 350), had 26 consonantal letters:

It was properly written right-to-left. Vowels were not indicated.

Geʽez abugida 

Modern Geʽez is written from left to right.

During the adoption or introduction of Christianity, the Geʽez abugida developed under the influence of Christian scripture by adding obligatory vocalic diacritics to the consonantal letters. The diacritics for the vowels, were fused with the consonants in a recognizable but slightly irregular way, so that the system is laid out as a syllabary. The resulting forms are shown below in their traditional order.

To represent a consonant with no following phonemic vowel, for example at the end of a syllable or in a consonant cluster, the  form is used (the character in the sixth column).

Labiovelar variants 
The letters for the labialized velar consonants are variants of the non-labialized velar consonants:

Unlike the other consonants, these labiovelar ones can be combined with only five different vowels:

Adaptations to other languages 
The Geʽez abugida has been adapted to several modern languages of Eritrea and Ethiopia, frequently requiring additional letters.

Additional letters 
Some letters were modified to create additional consonants for use in languages other than Geʽez. This is typically done by adding a horizontal line at the top of a similar-sounding consonant. 

The vocalised forms are shown below. Like the other labiovelars, these labiovelars can only be combined with five vowels.

Letters used in modern abugidas
The Amharic abugida uses all the basic consonants plus the ones indicated below. Some of the Geʽez labiovelar variants are also used.

A few of the basic consonants are falling into disuse in Eritrea (as they used "ጸ" for "ፀ"). See Tigrinya language#Writing system for details.

It also uses the ones indicated below. It does not use the Geʽez labiovelar letter variants.

It also uses the ones indicated below and the Geʽez labiovelar letter variants.

Although  is occasionally used,  is strongly favored. It also uses the ones indicated below.

Note: "V" is used for words of foreign origin except for in some Gurage languages, e.g. cravat 'tie' from French. The consonant phoneme "x" is pronounced as "h" in Amharic.

List order 
For Geʽez, Amharic, Tigrinya and Tigre, the usual sort order is called halähamä (h–l–ħ–m). Where the labiovelar variants are used, these come immediately after the basic consonant and are followed by other variants. In Tigrinya, for example, the letters based on  come in this order: . In Bilen, the sorting order is slightly different.

The alphabetical order is similar to that found in other South Semitic scripts, as well as in the ancient Ugaritic alphabet, which attests both the southern Semitic h-l-ħ-m order and the northern Semitic ʼ–b–g–d (abugida) order over three thousand years ago.

Numerals 

Geʽez uses an additional alphabetic numeral system comparable to the Hebrew, Arabic abjad and Greek numerals. It differs from these systems, however, in that it lacks individual characters for the multiples of 100, thus making it function similarly to, but not exactly like, Chinese numerals. (Unlike the Chinese script, Ge'ez has individual characters for multiples of 10.) For example, 475 is written (that is "4-100-70-5", and 83,692 is ( "8-10,000-30-6-100-90-2". Numbers are over- and underlined with a vinculum; in proper typesetting these combine to make a single bar, but some less sophisticated fonts cannot render this and show separate bars above and below each character.

{|class="wikitable" style="text-align:center"
|-
! !!1!!2!!3!!4!!5!!6!!7!!8!!9
|-style="font-size:2em;line-height:1.3"
!style="font-size:0.5em;text-align:right"|× 1
|፩||፪||፫||፬||፭||፮||፯||፰||፱
|-style="font-size:2em;line-height:1.2"
!style="font-size:0.5em;text-align:right"|× 10
|፲||፳||፴||፵||፶||፷||፸||፹||፺
|-style="font-size:2em;line-height:1.3"
!style="font-size:0.5em;text-align:right"|× 100
|፻||colspan="8" rowspan="2" style="background:#cccccc"| 
|-style="font-size:2em;line-height:1.3"
!style="font-size:0.5em;text-align:right"|× 10,000
|፼
|}
Ethiopian numerals were borrowed from the Greek numerals, possibly via Coptic uncial letters.
{|style=font-size:200%;text-align:center
|-style=font-size:50%
!!!1!!2!!3!!4!!5!!6!!7!!8!!9!!10!!20!!30!!40!!50!!60!!70!!80!!90!!100
|-
!style=font-size:50%|Ethiopic||፩||፪||፫||፬||፭||፮||፯||፰||፱||፲||፳||፴||፵||፶||፷||፸||፹||፺||፻
|-style=font-family:serif
!style=font-size:50%;font-family:sans-serif|Greek
|Α||Β||Γ||Δ||Ε||Ϛ||Ζ||Η||Θ||Ι||Κ||Λ||Μ||Ν||Ξ||Ο||Π||Ϙ||Ρ
|-style=font-family:sans-serif
!style=font-size:50%;font-family:serif|Coptic
|Ⲁ||Ⲃ||Ⲅ||Ⲇ||Ⲉ||Ⲋ||Ⲍ||Ⲏ||Ⲑ||Ⲓ||Ⲕ||Ⲗ||Ⲙ||Ⲛ||Ⲝ||Ⲟ||Ⲡ||Ϥ||Ⲣ
|}

Punctuation 
Punctuation, much of it modern, includes

፠ section mark
፡ word separator
። full stop (period)
፣ comma
፥ colon
፤ semicolon
፦ preface colon. Uses:
 In transcribed interviews, after the name of the speaker whose transcribed speech immediately follows; compare the colon in western text
 In ordered lists, after the ordinal symbol (such as a letter or number), separating it from the text of the item; compare the colon, period, or right parenthesis in western text
 Many other functions of the colon in western text
፧ question mark
፨ paragraph separator

Unicode 

Ethiopic has been assigned Unicode 3.0 codepoints between U+1200 and U+137F (decimal 4608–4991), containing the consonantal letters for Geʽez, Amharic and Tigrinya, punctuation and numerals. Additionally, in Unicode 4.1, there is the supplement range from U+1380 to U+139F (decimal 4992–5023) containing letters for Sebat Bet and tonal marks, and the extended range between U+2D80 and U+2DDF (decimal 11648–11743) containing letters needed for writing Sebat Bet, Meʼen and Bilen. In Unicode 6.0, there is the extended-A range from U+AB00 to U+AB2F (decimal 43776–43823) containing letters for Gamo-Gofa-Dawro, Basketo and Gumuz. Finally in Unicode 14.0, there is the extended-B range from U+1E7E0 to U+1E7FF (decimal 124896–124927) containing additional letters for Gurage languages.

In western culture

 Geʽez is a sacred script in the Rastafari movement. Roots reggae musicians have used it in album art.
 The films 500 Years Later and Motherland are the first two mainstream Western documentaries to use Geʽez characters in the titles. The script also appears in the trailer and promotional material of the films.
 In October 2020, tweets by Donald Trump relating to his COVID-19 infection attracted responses with an uncanny image accompanied by copypasta Ge'ez script, often an Amharic curse, which sought to troll Trump's Christian supporters. The implication that Ge'ez script looks demonic or satanic was condemned by Ethiopians and others as racist and othering.

See also
Ancient South Arabian script
History of the alphabet

Literature 
 Azeb Amha. 2010. On loans and additions to the fidäl (Ethiopic) writing system, in: The Idea of Writing: Play and Complexity, Alexander J. de Voogt, Irving L. Finkel (editors), 179–196. Brill.
 Marcel Cohen, "La prononciation traditionnelle du Guèze (éthiopien classique)", in: Journal asiatique (1921) Sér. 11 / T. 18.
 Gabe F. Scelta, The Comparative Origin and Usage of the Ge'ez writing system of Ethiopia (2001)

References

External links 
 Fonts for Geʽez script:
 Noto Sans Ethiopic (multiple weights and widths)
 Noto Serif Ethiopic (multiple weights and widths)
 Abyssinica SIL (Character set support )
 Chart correlating IPA values for the Amharic alphabet
 Unicode specification
 Ethiopic
 Ethiopic Supplement
 Ethiopic Extended
 Ethiopic Extended-A
 Ethiopic Extended-B
 A Look at Ethiopic Numerals
 The Names of Geʽez Letters

Abugida writing systems
Alphabet
Writing systems of Africa
Semitic writing systems